Kevin Lee Munson (born January 3, 1989) is an American professional baseball pitcher who is currently a free agent. Before beginning his professional career, Munson attended James Madison University and played college baseball for the James Madison Dukes. He was drafted by the Arizona Diamondbacks, and selected by the Philadelphia Phillies from the Diamondbacks in the 2013 Rule 5 Draft.

Career

Amateur
Munson attended Cave Spring High School in Roanoke, Virginia. He then enrolled at James Madison University, where he played college baseball for the James Madison Dukes baseball team. Munson played collegiate summer baseball for the Bourne Braves of the Cape Cod Baseball League in 2009, was named a league all-star, and helped lead Bourne to the league title. After the 2010 season, he was named the Colonial Athletic Association's pitcher of the year and a third team All-American by Collegiate Baseball Newspaper.

Arizona Diamondbacks
The Arizona Diamondbacks selected Munson in the fourth round of the 2010 MLB Draft, with the 121st selection. He signed with the Diamondbacks, receiving a $243,000 signing bonus. After the 2011 and 2012 seasons, the Diamondbacks sent him to the Arizona Fall League. By 2013, he reached Class AAA, the highest level of minor league baseball, where he pitched for the Reno Aces. Mike Parrott, Reno's pitching coach, said Munson is "a good candidate to [at] some time be called up to the big leagues next year.".

Philadelphia Phillies
On December 12, 2013, Munson was selected by the Philadelphia Phillies with the fourth pick in the Rule 5 draft. According to the rules, Munson had to make the Phillies' Opening Day roster and remain with the team for the entire season, or the Phillies will have to offer Munson back to the Diamondbacks. After competing for a spot in the Phillies' bullpen during spring training,

Return to Diamondbacks
He was returned to the Diamondbacks on March 18, 2014.

Munson pitched for Reno in 2014, compiling a 4–3 win–loss record with a 2.60 earned run average. After the season, the Diamondbacks added Munson to their 40-man roster to protect him from the next Rule 5 draft. He was designated for assignment on August 31, 2015.

He elected free agency on October 13, 2015.

Seattle Mariners
He signed a minor league deal with the Seattle Mariners on July 1, 2016. He elected free agency on November 7, 2016.

Lancaster Barnstormers
On March 28, 2017, Munson signed with the Lancaster Barnstormers of the Atlantic League of Professional Baseball. He became a free agent after the 2017 season. Signed with the Tigres Del Licey, in the winter of 2017. Had a 3.12 ERA with 11K in 8.2 innings pitched.

On February 19, 2018, Munson re-signed with the Lancaster Barnstormers.
 He became a free agent following the season.

Southern Maryland Blue Crabs
On May 8, 2019, Munson signed with the Southern Maryland Blue Crabs of the Atlantic League of Professional Baseball. He became a free agent following the season.

Return to Seattle Mariners
On January 7, 2020, Munson signed a minor league deal with the Seattle Mariners. On January 5, 2021, Munson re-signed with the Mariners organization on a minor league contract. On April 15, 2021, Munson was released by the Mariners.

References

External links

1989 births
Living people
Sportspeople from Roanoke, Virginia
Baseball players from Virginia
Baseball pitchers
James Madison Dukes baseball players
Bourne Braves players
South Bend Silver Hawks players
Visalia Rawhide players
Mobile BayBears players
Salt River Rafters players
Reno Aces players
Naranjeros de Hermosillo players
American expatriate baseball players in Mexico
Leones del Escogido players
Arizona League Diamondbacks players
Lancaster Barnstormers players
Tacoma Rainiers players
Tigres del Licey players
American expatriate baseball players in the Dominican Republic
Southern Maryland Blue Crabs players